Dinsha Jhaverbhai Patel (born 25 May 1937) is  an Indian National Congress politician who was a member of the 15th Lok Sabha of India.

He represented the Kheda constituency of Gujarat and is a member of the Indian National Congress. He was the Union Cabinet Minister, Mines. He was the Minister of State in the Ministry of Mines (Independent Charge) from 19 Jan 2011 to 27 Sep 2012. He was also a Minister of State in the Ministry of Micro, Small and Medium Enterprises (Independent Charge) from May 2009 to 18 Jan 2011 and was a Minister of State in the Ministry of Petroleum and Natural Gas from 2006 to 2009. On 28 October 2012 he was given the responsibilities of Union Cabinet Minister, Mines.

Contesting against Modi

Patel was chosen by the Indian National Congress to contest against Narendra Modi on the Maninagar constituency in the 2007 Gujarat Legislative Assembly election.

His selection was based on his clean image and his Patel community background. He was selected after congress could not find any suitable candidate to oppose Narendra Modi. He was also being projected as the future Chief Minister of Gujarat. He lost the elections by more than 86, 000 votes.

In the previous elections he lost the assembly elections in the Nadiad constituency against Pankaj Desai, however he has won the Parliament elections since 1975 from Nadiad.

References

External links
 Official biographical sketch in Parliament of India website
 Official website of Dinsha patel
 Official Bio-data
 Images of Dinsha Patel from The Hindu

1937 births
Living people
People from Kheda district
People from Nadiad
Indian National Congress politicians
India MPs 2004–2009
Union ministers of state of India
India MPs 2009–2014
Mining ministers of India
India MPs 1996–1997
India MPs 1998–1999
India MPs 1999–2004
Lok Sabha members from Gujarat
Gujarat MLAs 1975–1980
Gujarat MLAs 1980–1985
Gujarat MLAs 1985–1990
Gujarat MLAs 1990–1995
Gujarat MLAs 1995–1998